ISRO may refer to:

Indian Space Research Organisation, India's national space agency.
International Strategic Research Organization, the Turkish think tank.